JinSoul (also known as KimLip & JinSoul ) is the seventh single album from South Korean girl group Loona's pre-debut project. It was released digitally on June 26 and physically on June 28, 2017, by Blockberry Creative and distributed by CJ E&M. It officially introduces member JinSoul and contains two tracks, JinSoul's solo "Singing in the Rain" and a duet with Kim Lip called "Love Letter". A version of "Singing in the Rain" featuring HeeJin rapping was released July 9, 2017. The remix has an accompanying music video that was released via V Live.

Track listing

Charts

References

2017 singles
Loona (group) albums
Single albums
Blockberry Creative singles
Future bass EPs